"Fly Girl" is a song by Australian R&B band Kulcha. It was released in September 1994 as the third single from the band's debut studio album Kulcha. The song peaked at number 26 in Australia and 4 in New Zealand.

Track listing
 "Fly Girl" (single mix) 
 "Fly Girl" (album mix)	
 "Bring It On" (album mix)

Charts

References

1994 singles
1994 songs
Kulcha (band) songs